Giridih district is one of the twenty-four districts of Jharkhand state, India, and Giridih is the administrative headquarters of this district. As of 2011 it is the third most populous district of Jharkhand (out of 24), after Ranchi and Dhanbad.

History
Giridh district was a part of Kharagdiha estate till late 18th century. During the British Raj Giridih became a part of Jungle Terry. After Kol Uprising in 1831, the parganas of Ramgarh, Kharagdiha, Kendi and Kunda became parts of the South-West Frontier Agency and were formed into a division named Hazaribag as the administrative headquarters. The Kharagdiha Rajas were settled as Rajas of Raj Dhanwar in 1809, and the Kharagdiha gadis were separately settled as zamindari estates. Some of the notable Kharagdiha Zamindari estates were Koderma, Gadi Palganj, Ledo Gadi, Gande Gadi, Ghoranji Gadi and Gadi Sirsia. 
Giridih district was created on 6 December 1972 by carving some parts of Hazaribagh district. In 1999 part of it became Bokaro district.

It is currently a part of the Red Corridor. The 15,000-capacity football and cricket stadium named Giridih Stadium is the largest sports venue by capacity in the region. It is located in the town of Mahthadih.

Geography
The district,  covering an area of around 4854 km², is bounded on the north by Jamui district and Nawada district of Bihar state, on the east by the districts of Deoghar and Jamtara, on the south by Dhanbad and Bokaro, and on the west by Hazaribagh and Koderma districts.

Giridih has an average elevation of 289 metres (948 feet). Śrī Sammeta Shikharji also known as the Parasnath Hills,it is one of the holiest place of Jainism, located in Giridih is the highest mountain peak in Jharkhand. It is a conical granite peak located 4,477 feet (1,382 metres) above the sea level.

Gawan and Tisari blocks of the district have several mica mines, and coal is found abundantly at several places throughout the district.

Parasnath Hills are located in the district. There are two major rivers, namely, the Barakar River and the Sakri River. Barakar River passes through Birni and Pirtand blocks. Sakari river drains the areas of Deori and Gawan blocks. There are several smaller rivers, including Usri, with a major tourist attraction - Usri Falls.

Administration

Blocks 

Giridih district comprises the following 13 blocks:

Subdivisions 

Following are the four subdivision of the district:

 Giridih subdivision
 Bagodar-Sariya subdivision
 Khorimahua subdivision
 Dumri subdivision

Economy
In 2006 the Indian government named Giridh one of the country's 250 most backward districts (out of a total of 640). It is one of the 21 districts in Jharkhand currently receiving funds from the Backward Regions Grant Fund Programme (BRGF).

The DDP of Giridih District is ₹1,97,771(2003-04) and Income Per Capita is ₹9921(2003-04).

Divisions
There are six Vidhan Sabha (legislative assembly) constituencies in this district. Dhanwar, Bagodar, Jamua and Gandey assembly constituencies are part of Kodarma constituency. Giridih and Dumri assembly constituencies are part of Giridih constituency.

Demographics

According to the 2011 census Giridih district has a population of 2,445,474 roughly equal to the nation of Kuwait or the US state of New Mexico. This gives it a ranking of 182nd in India (out of a total of 640). Its population growth rate over the decade 2001-2011 was  28.33%. Giridih has a sex ratio of 943 females for every 1000 males, and a literacy rate of 65.12%. Scheduled Castes and Scheduled Tribes made up 13.31% and 9.74% of the population respectively.

75.9% of the population is Hindu, 20.8% is Muslim, 2.42% are Others and 0.6% Christian.

At the time of the 2011 Census of India, 68.71% of the population in the district spoke Khortha, 13.55% Hindi, 8.99% Santali and 7.47% Urdu as their first language.

Khortha, a blend of Magahi and Bengali, is the main language spoken in Giridih district. The tribal people speak Santhali.

Flora and fauna

The district has rich forest resources and have several jungles of sal trees and bamboos, and a variety of other indigenous trees. Among other common trees are bamboo, semal, Mahua, palash, kusum, kend, Asian pear and bhelwa. Parasnath hills have a number of plants having medicinal use. Leopards, bears, jackals, wild pigs, and hares are the wild animals found in certain parts of the district which have thick forests.

Politics 

|}

Tourism

References

External links
 Official government website

 
Community development blocks in Jharkhand
Community development blocks in Giridih district
Districts of Jharkhand
Coal mining districts in India
1972 establishments in Bihar